Sosa was a sub-district of Padang Lawas, North Sumatra, Indonesia.

The majority of the population has Hasibuan and Harahap as surname. Two-thirds of the vast expanse of Sosa is oil palm plantations.

Geography of North Sumatra